Grape Grove is an unincorporated community in Greene County, in the U.S. state of Ohio.

History
Grape Grove was not officially platted. A post office called Grape Grove was established in 1850, the name was changed to Grapegrove in 1895, and the post office closed in 1906.

Notable person
 John Little, member of the U.S. House of Representatives from Ohio's 8th district

References

Unincorporated communities in Greene County, Ohio
1850 establishments in Ohio
Populated places established in 1850
Unincorporated communities in Ohio